Jan Banaś (born Hans Dieter Banas on 29 March 1943 in the Schöneberg district of Berlin), nicknamed Bubi, is a Polish footballer, who began his career as a youngster playing for AKS Mikołów (1956–59) before moving to Zryw Chorzów in 1959-62, Polonia Bytom (1962–69) and Górnik Zabrze (1969–75). Between his first call-up for Poland in 1964 and his last in 1973, he earned 31 caps, scoring nine goals (or ten, if the controversial goal in the 1973 win over England is credited to him). Aged 32, he was allowed to move to the United States, and then played in a string of countries including Mexico (with Atlético Español), Belgium, and France well after his fortieth birthday.

Recently he has been coaching low-level Silesian clubs, including Szombierki Bytom.

In 1966, together with Jan Liberda and Norbert Pogrzeba, Banas decided to illegally migrate to Western Europe, they all escaped before the game Polonia Bytom vs. IFK Norrköping. He was unable to achieve much success even in the German Oberliga, and half a year later he returned and was pardoned by the Polish Football Association. After return, he changed his name to the Polish form, and took the name Jan in March 1967.

External links
 
 

1943 births
Living people
Poland international footballers
Polish footballers
Polish expatriate footballers
Ekstraklasa players
Liga MX players
Górnik Zabrze players
Polonia Bytom players
Atlético Español footballers
Expatriate footballers in Mexico
Polish expatriate sportspeople in Mexico
Expatriate soccer players in the United States
Polish expatriate sportspeople in the United States
Footballers from Berlin
Polish football managers
Szombierki Bytom managers
Szombierki Bytom players
Association football midfielders